The Numb E.P. is an EP by Baboon. It was released in 1996 on Grass Records. The label wanted the E.P. to serve as a "teaser" for the forthcoming album, Secret Robot Control.

It was also designed to capitalize on the band's appearance on an episode of the TV series Walker, Texas Ranger. A sticker on the CD's shrinkwrap contained a quote by Chuck Norris about the band: "It's terrible, but I guess you gotta have that kind of music, too."

Track listing
 "Numb" – 2:22
 "I'm OK if You're OK" – 3:40
 "Give Me Something Real" – 2:44
 "Parade Ground Explosion" – 4:12
 "Master Salvatoris" – 1:47
 "Why'd You Say Die" – 3:50

All songs by Baboon.

Personnel
 Andrew Huffstetler – vocals, trombone
 Mike Rudnicki – guitar, backing vocals
 Steven Barnett – drums
 Mark Hughes – bass guitar
 Bryan Schmitz – bass guitar on "Numb"
 Bart Rogers – bass guitar on "Why'd You Say Die"
 Andy VanDette – mastering
 Jack Malken – mixing on "Give Me Something Real" and "Parade Ground Explosion"
 Shannon Vavrinchik – design

Baboon (band) albums
1996 EPs